Ali Siqli (born in 1932) is a Moroccan writer of children's books and drama. In 1982 he received the Great Prize of Morocco (Doctor Honoris Causa) and the international King Faysal award.

Bibliography
 Abt:âl al-h:idjâra., Casablanca: Mat:ba'a al-Nadjâh: al-Djadîda, 1998. (poetic novel)
 Al-Amîra Zaynab., Casablanca: Mat:ba'a al-Nadjâh: al-Djadîda, 1989.(poetry)
 Al-fath: al-akbar., Casablanca: Mat:ba'a al-Nadjâh: al-Djadîda, 1986.(drama)
 Al-Ma'raka al-kubrá, Casablanca: Mat:ba'a al-Nadjâh: al-Djadîda, 1983.
(for this book he received the Great Prize of Morocco)

 Amîra Zaynab,  Casablanca: S.E., 1989.
 H:awla riwâya al-Ma'âraka al-Kubrâ, Casablanca: Mat:ba'a al-Nadjâh al-Djadîda, 1983. (reflections on his own work)
 Ma'a al-asîratayn, Casablanca: Mat:ba' al-Nadjâh: al-Djadîda, 1988.(drama)
 Masâmîr wa-mazâmîr, Rîh:ân wa-alh:ân,  Casablanca: Mat:ba'a al-Nadjâh: al-Djadîda, 1982. (songs and poems)
 Risâlatî: Malh:ama shi'riyya 'alâ lisân Ibn Bat:t:űt:a, Rabat: Dâr al-Manâhil, 1997. (poem on the life of Ibn Batuta)
 Rîh:ân wa-alh:ân, Casablanca: Mat:ba'a al-Nadjâh: al-Djadîda, 1982. (poems and songs)
  Sakîna bint al-Shahîd, Casablanca: Mat:ba'a al-Nadjâh al-Djadîda, 1991.(drama)
 Âsî al-h:ayy, Casablanca: Mat:ba'a al-Nadjâh: al-Djadîda, 2002.(drama)

See also
 Thouria Saqqat

References

External links
 Literatura Marroquí Contémporanea  (retrieved 27-09-2011)

Moroccan children's writers
1932 births
Living people
20th-century Moroccan writers
21st-century Moroccan writers